Robert Sears may refer to:

 Robert Sears (sportsman) (1884–1979), American fencer and modern pentathlete
 Robert Sears (physician), contemporary American pediatrician
 Robert Richardson Sears (1908–1989), American psychologist